Alexe Iacovici is a Romanian sprint canoer who competed in the early 1960s. He won a gold medal in the C-2 1000 m event at the 1963 ICF Canoe Sprint World Championships in Jajce.

References

Living people
Romanian male canoeists
Year of birth missing (living people)
ICF Canoe Sprint World Championships medalists in Canadian